Morelos is a town and seat of the municipality of Morelos Municipality, in the northern Mexican state of Chihuahua. As of 2010, the town had a population of 813, up from 735 as of 2005.

References

Populated places in Chihuahua (state)